Stolberg may refer to:

Towns in Germany 
 Stolberg (Harz) in the district of Mansfeld-Südharz in Saxony-Anhalt, seat of the counts of Stolberg.
 Stolberg (Rhineland) in the district of Aachen in North Rhine-Westphalia, part of the Duchy of Jülich until 1794, awarded to Prussia in 1815.
 Stollberg, in the Erzgebirgskreis in the Free State of Saxony.

Former states of the Holy Roman Empire 
 County of Stolberg, created from the County of Hohnstein in 1210 and partitioned to Harz line (S-Stolberg) and Rhenish line (S-Rochefort and S-Königstein) in 1548
 Stolberg-Gedern, partitioned from S-Wernigerode in 1677 and reunited thereto in 1804
 Stolberg-Königstein, created from the partition of the County of Stolberg in 1548
 Stolberg-Rochefort, created from the partition of the County of Stolberg in 1548
 Stolberg-Rossla, partitioned from S-Stolberg in 1706, mediatised to the Electorate of Saxony in 1803 and awarded to Prussia in 1815
 Stolberg-Schwarza, rejoined S-Wernigerode in 1748
 Stolberg-Stolberg, created from the partition of the County of Stolberg in 1548, partitioned in 1645 and 1706 to create S-Werngerode and S-Rossla, mediatised to the Electorate of Saxony in 1803 and awarded to Prussia in 1815
 Stolberg-Wernigerode, partitioned from S-Stolberg in 1645, partitioned to create S-Gedern in 1677, mediatised to Westphalia in 1807 and awarded to Prussia in 1815

People 
Listed in chronological order by date of birth:
 The House of Stolberg, a large German noble family (Hoher Adel) with many branches.
 Count Botho of Stolberg the Elder († 1455)
 Count Henry the Younger of Stolberg (1467–1508), Governor of Frisia
 Anna II of Stolberg (1504–1574), imperial abbess of Quedlinburg
 Countess Juliana of Stolberg-Wernigerode (1506–1580), mother of William I of Orange, leader of the Dutch Revolt against the Spanish in the 16th century and co-founder of the current Dutch royal family House of Orange-Nassau.
 Count Henry of Stolberg (1509–1572)
 Count Christian Ernest of Stolberg-Wernigerode (1691–1771)
 Prince Frederick Charles of Stolberg-Gedern (1693–1767)
 Countess Ferdinande Henriette of Stolberg-Gedern (1699–1750)
 Count Henry Ernest of Stolberg-Wernigerode (1716–1778)
 Count Christian Frederick of Stolberg-Wernigerode (1746–1824)
 Christian, Count of Stolberg-Stolberg (1748–1821), German poet, translator and lyricist
 Friedrich Leopold, Graf zu Stolberg-Stolberg (1750–1819), German poet, translator and lawyer
 Princess Louise of Stolberg-Gedern (1752–1824), wife of Bonnie Prince Charlie, pretender to the thrones of Great Britain and Ireland
 Countess Augusta Louise of Stolberg-Stolberg (1753–1835)
 Countess Louise of Stolberg-Wernigerode (1771–1856), Abbess of Drübeck Abbey
 Count Henry of Stolberg-Wernigerode (1772–1854)
 Count Anthony of Stolberg-Wernigerode (1785–1854)
 Prince Otto of Stolberg-Wernigerode (1837–1896), Governor of the Prince of Hanover, German Vice-Chancellor under Bismarck

Fiction 
 Stolberg (television series), a German detective television series named for its lead character Martin Stolberg